The 1st Mechanized Cavalry Brigade (1st Brigade C Mec), is one of the mechanized brigades of the Brazilian Army.  Its headquarters is located in the city of Santiago, in the Brazilian state of Rio Grande do Sul. It is part of the Brazilian Army 3rd Division, based in the city of Santa Maria, Rio Grande do Sul. Also known by its historical designation - Brigade José Luiz Menna Barreto.

Subordinated Military Organizations . 

 HQ/1st Mechanized Cavalry Brigade - Santiago
 HQ Troops/1st Mechanized Cavalry Brigade - Santiago 
 1st Mechanized Cavalry Regiment - Itaqui
 2nd Mechanized Cavalry Regiment - São Borja
 4th Armored Cavalry Regiment - São Luiz Gonzaga
 19th Mechanized Cavalry Regiment - Santa Rosa
 19th Field Artillery Group - Santiago
 9th Logistic Battalion - Santiago
 1st Mechanized Combat Engineering Company - São Borja
 11th Mechanized Signal Company - Santiago 
 1st Military Police Platoon - Santiago

See also
 Ministry of Defence (Brazil)
 Brazilian Army

References

External links
1st Mechanized Cavalry Brigade (1ª Bda C Mec) web page

Army units and formations of Brazil
Brazil